Carl-Erik Ohlson (23 September 1920 – 24 December 2015) was a Swedish sailor who competed in the 1952 Summer Olympics. He won a bronze medal as crew member of the Swedish boat Hojwa in the 5.5 metre class event.

References

External links
 
 
 

1920 births
2015 deaths
Swedish male sailors (sport)
Olympic sailors of Sweden
Sailors at the 1952 Summer Olympics – 5.5 Metre
Olympic bronze medalists for Sweden
Olympic medalists in sailing
Royal Gothenburg Yacht Club sailors

Medalists at the 1952 Summer Olympics
20th-century Swedish people